Eight ships of the Royal Navy have borne the name HMS Bonaventure, and another was planned:

  was a warship built in 1489, and gone by 1509.
 , also known as Edward Bonaventure, was a ship built in 1551 and wrecked in 1556.
 , also known as Elizabeth Bonaventure, was a 47-gun ship purchased in 1567 and in service in 1599.
  was a 32-gun ship launched in 1621 and lost in action in 1653.
  was a 42-gun ship, previously named HMS President.  She was renamed HMS Bonaventure in 1660, was rebuilt in 1666 and broken up for a rebuild in 1711.  She was relaunched in 1711 as a 50-gun fourth rate.  She was renamed HMS Argyll in 1715, was rebuilt in 1722 and was sunk as a breakwater in 1748.
  was an  second-class cruiser launched in 1892.  She was a used as a submarine depot ship from 1910 and was broken up in 1920.
  was a  light cruiser launched in 1939 and sunk in 1941.
  was an ‘X’ craft midget submarine depot ship launched in 1942 and sold in 1948.

See also
She was sold to the Royal Canadian Navy in 1952 and renamed HMCS Bonaventure. She was broken up in 1971.

Battle honours
 Lowestoft 1665
 Four Days Battle 1666
 Orfordness 1666
 Solebay 1672
 Schooneveld 1673
 Texel 1673
 Beachy Head 1690
 Barfleur 1692
 China 1900
 Malta Convoys 1941–42

References
 
 Submarine depot ships
 Submarine depot ships of WWII

Royal Navy ship names